Jeffrey Levy is an American ice hockey coach and former goaltender who was an All-American for New Hampshire.

Career
Levy grew up in Salt Lake City and played high school hockey in the region. He took a chance to advance his career by moving to Minnesota for his senior year. He managed to get on the Rochester Mustangs as a third goaltender and played well in his minimal appearances. The following year he became the team's starter and began to make a name for himself. Levy helped the Mustangs win the US National junior ice hockey championship in 1990 and he used the notoriety to earn a scholarship to the University of New Hampshire. Levy was also selected by the Minnesota North Stars in the NHL Draft that summer, something he admittedly didn't fully comprehend.

Levy made an immediate impact in college, taking over as the starter as a freshman and being named an All-American. He backstopped the Wildcats to the team's first winning season in 7 years and was among the best goaltenders in terms of production for the year. The following season he continued to improve and led UNH to the Hockey East championship game and was named the best goaltender of the tournament. The team's stellar season also helped them earn an at-large bid to the NCAA Tournament for the first time in 9 years. After his sophomore season, he was offered an NHL contract by the North Stars and he accepted.

When he appeared in training camp in the fall, Levy was not prepared for the vast difference between college and the NHL levels. He played a year in the minors with the Kalamazoo Wings but was definitely a work in progress for an extended professional career. That offseason he was also invited to take part in the tryout for the US national team for the upcoming Winter Olympics and made the squad along with fellow college standouts Mike Dunham and Garth Snow. Levy ended up becoming the third goaltender on the squad and, due to a lack of available playing time, was returned to Minnesota prior to the game and did not participate. His pro career never fully materialized, unfortunately, and after getting demoted to the ECHL, Levy retired once his rookie contract with the North Stars expired.

Levy was frustrated by how his career had gone and he remained out of the game for five years. Eventually, however, he caught 'the bug' and wanted to get back into the net. He returned to minor pro hockey for the later half of the 2000 season and played in parts of five campaigns. Levy was much happier with his play after his return and believed that, if he had played as well earlier, he could have continued at a higher level for much longer.

After retiring as a player, Levy returned to the game as a coach at the junior hockey level, helping teach his son Hank how to improve his play.

Statistics

Regular season and playoffs

Awards and honors

References

External links

1970 births
Living people
AHCA Division I men's ice hockey All-Americans
American men's ice hockey goaltenders
Ice hockey people from Nebraska
Sportspeople from Omaha, Nebraska
New Hampshire Wildcats men's ice hockey players
Kalamazoo Wings (1974–2000) players
Dayton Bombers players
Huntington Blizzard players
Jacksonville Lizard Kings players
El Paso Buzzards players
Rio Grande Valley Killer Bees players
Minnesota North Stars draft picks